Born Again may refer to:

Religion
 Arhat or 'arhant', the Buddhist conception which succeeds the earlier Dvija concept in the Dharmic tradition
 Born again, a Christian term for spiritual rebirth and salvation
 Dvija, the concept of being "twice-born" prominent in Hinduism since classical times

Film and television
 Born Again (film), a 1978 American film
 Born Again (TV series), a 2020 South Korean television series
Daredevil: Born Again, an upcoming superhero television series set in the Marvel Cinematic Universe

Episodes
 "Born Again" (The Americans)
 "Born Again" (Doctor Who)
 "Born Again" (Vikings)
 "Born Again" (The X-Files)

Literature
 "Born Again" (comics), a 1986 Daredevil story arc
 Born Again, a 1976 book by Charles Colson
 "Born Again", a 2005 short story by K. D. Wentworth

Music

Albums
 Born Again (Black Sabbath album), 1983
 Born Again (Mica Paris album), 2009
 Born Again (Newsboys album), 2010
 Born Again (The Notorious B.I.G. album), 1999
 Born Again (Randy Newman album), 1979
 Born Again (Red Flag album), 2007
 Born Again (Warrant album), 2006
 Born Again (Wumpscut album), 1998
 Born Again, by Blood Axis, 2011
 Born Again, by Farmer Boys, 2018
 Born Again, by Pat Boone, 1973

Songs
 "Born Again" (SHY & DRS song), 2014
 "Born Again" (Starsailor song), 2003
 "Born Again" (Third Day song), 2009
 "Born Again" (Tiffany Young song), 2019
 "Born Again", by Austin French from the album Wide Open, 2018
 "Born Again", by Blood Axis from the album Born Again, 2011
 "Born Again", by Badly Drawn Boy from Have You Fed the Fish?
 "Born Again", by The Christians from The Christians
 "Born Again", by Cory Asbury from Reckless Love
 "Born Again", by Debby Kerner & Ernie Rettino
 "Born Again", by Marilyn Manson from Holy Wood (In the Shadow of the Valley of Death)
 "Born Again", by Rihanna from Black Panther: Wakanda Forever – Music from and Inspired By
 "Born Again", by Saint Motel from Saintmotelevision
 "Born Again", by Supergrass from Supergrass

See also
 Born Again Movement
 Born Again Pagans, a 1994 album by Coil Vs. ELpH
 Born-again virgin
 Björn Again, an ABBA tribute band
 Bourne-again shell or bash, a Unix-like shell
 Renaissance
 Rebirth (disambiguation)
 Reborn (disambiguation)